Johannes Wallmann may refer to:
H. Johannes Wallmann, German composer
Johannes Wallmann (theologian), German theologian